Glutamate receptor, ionotropic, N-methyl D-aspartate-associated protein 1 (glutamate binding) is a protein in humans that is encoded by the GRINA gene.

References 

Genes
Human proteins